Vidya Prasarak Mandal's Maharshi Parshuram College of Engineering was started at Velneshwar in 2012. It started first-year engineering courses from academic year 2012–13.

References

External links

Engineering colleges in Maharashtra
Ratnagiri district
Educational institutions established in 2012
2012 establishments in Maharashtra